Arnegg railway station is a railway station in Gossau, in the Swiss canton of St. Gallen. It is an intermediate stop on the Sulgen–Gossau line.

Services 
Arnegg is served by the S5 of the St. Gallen S-Bahn:

References

External links 
 
 

Railway stations in the canton of St. Gallen
Swiss Federal Railways stations